In Greek mythology, the name Pallene  (Ancient Greek: Παλλήνη) may refer to two Thracian characters:

 Pallene, one of the Alcyonides, daughters of the giant Alcyoneus. She was the sister of Alkippe, Anthe, Asteria, Drimo, Methone and Phthonia (Phosthonia or Chthonia). When their father was slain by Heracles, these girls threw themselves into the sea from Kanastraion, which is the peak of Pellene. They were then transformed into halcyons (kingfishers) by the goddess Amphitrite.
 Pallene, a Thracian princess as the daughter of King Sithon and the nymph Mendeis or the naiad Achiroe, and the sister of Rhoeteia. She was wooed by Dryas and Clitus, and eventually married the latter, and had a daughter Chrysonoe (Torone), the wife of Proteus. Alternately, Pallene consorted with Dionysus.

Notes

References 

 Conon, Fifty Narrations, surviving as one-paragraph summaries in the Bibliotheca (Library) of Photius, Patriarch of Constantinople translated from the Greek by Brady Kiesling. Online version at the Topos Text Project.
 Nonnus of Panopolis, Dionysiaca translated by William Henry Denham Rouse (1863-1950), from the Loeb Classical Library, Cambridge, MA, Harvard University Press, 1940.  Online version at the Topos Text Project.
 Nonnus of Panopolis, Dionysiaca. 3 Vols. W.H.D. Rouse. Cambridge, MA., Harvard University Press; London, William Heinemann, Ltd. 1940-1942. Greek text available at the Perseus Digital Library.
 Parthenius, Love Romances translated by Sir Stephen Gaselee (1882-1943), S. Loeb Classical Library Volume 69. Cambridge, MA. Harvard University Press. 1916.  Online version at the Topos Text Project.
 Parthenius, Erotici Scriptores Graeci, Vol. 1. Rudolf Hercher. in aedibus B. G. Teubneri. Leipzig. 1858. Greek text available at the Perseus Digital Library.
 Stephanus of Byzantium, Stephani Byzantii Ethnicorum quae supersunt, edited by August Meineike (1790-1870), published 1849. A few entries from this important ancient handbook of place names have been translated by Brady Kiesling. Online version at the Topos Text Project.
 Suida, Suda Encyclopedia translated by Ross Scaife, David Whitehead, William Hutton, Catharine Roth, Jennifer Benedict, Gregory Hays, Malcolm Heath Sean M. Redmond, Nicholas Fincher, Patrick Rourke, Elizabeth Vandiver, Raphael Finkel, Frederick Williams, Carl Widstrand, Robert Dyer, Joseph L. Rife, Oliver Phillips and many others. Online version at the Topos Text Project.

Mythological Thracian women
Thracian characters in Greek mythology
Greek mythology of Thrace